Nattaung is the highest mountain of the Karen Hills. It is located in the border area between Kayin State and Kayah State, Burma,  to the west from the border with Thailand.

See also
List of Ultras of Southeast Asia
List of mountains in Burma

References

External links
Hoolock Gibbon and Biodiversity Survey on Khe Shor Ter Mountain, Nattaung Range, Karen State, Myanmar
Google Books, The Physical Geography of Southeast Asia

Kayin State
Mountains of Myanmar